Yukalikulevo (Yükälekül) is a rural locality (a selo) in Sukkulovsky Selsoviet, Dyurtyulinsky District, Bashkortostan, Russia. The population was 364 as of 2010. There are 4 streets.

Geography 
Yukalikulevo is located 14 km southeast of Dyurtyuli (the district's administrative centre) by road. Atsuyarovo is the nearest rural locality.

References 

Rural localities in Dyurtyulinsky District